Christian Wägli (22 December 1934 – 17 June 2019) was a Swiss sprinter and middle distance runner. He finished fifth in the 800 metres and sixth in the 4 × 400 metres relay at the 1960 Summer Olympics.

He became the Swiss Sports Personality of the Year in 1958. On the same year, he finished eighth in the 800 metres and competed in the 4 × 400 metres relay at the European Championships.

His personal best times were 47.1 seconds in the 400 metres and 1:47.40 minutes in the 800 metres, both achieved in 1960.

References

1934 births
2019 deaths
Athletes (track and field) at the 1960 Summer Olympics
Swiss male sprinters
Swiss male middle-distance runners
Olympic athletes of Switzerland